Kenneth Thomas Richey (born August 3, 1964), in Zeist, Netherlands is a British-US dual citizen who in 1987 was convicted in Ohio of murdering a two-year-old girl and sentenced to death. He spent 21 years on death row before re-examination of his case led to his release, after he accepted a plea bargain in which he pleaded no contest to manslaughter.

Early life
Richey was born in the Netherlands to a Scottish mother and an American father. He was raised in Edinburgh, Scotland but moved to Ohio to join his father in late 1982. He served in the Marines before moving into government-subsidized housing in Columbus Grove.

Murder conviction and imprisonment
On June 30, 1986, a fire broke out in the apartment complex in which Richey lived. The fire originated in an apartment where Hope Collins lived with her two-year-old daughter, Cynthia; Cynthia died of smoke inhalation. Prosecutors argued that Richey started the fire and was targeting his ex-girlfriend, Candy Barchet, who lived in the same apartment complex. At the death penalty sentencing hearing, evidence was presented regarding Richey's history of mental health problems; a psychologist and social worker testified that Richey had borderline personality disorder, antisocial personality disorder, and histrionic behavior disorder.

He was convicted in January 1987 of murder by arson, following which he spent 21 years on death row.

Release
In December 2007, he accepted a plea bargain, which led to his release from death row and return to Scotland on January 9, 2008.

Richey's plea bargain involved pleading 'no contest' to manslaughter, child endangering and breaking and entering. He was sentenced to time served, with the murder and arson charges dropped. A 'no contest' plea is not an admission of guilt. The accused, by entering a no contest plea, neither disputes nor admits to the charges.

During his 20-year incarceration, doubts arose about the circumstantial evidence that led to conviction, particularly the forensic evidence. This led to a campaign to re-examine the evidence. Amnesty International described the case as, "…one of the most compelling cases of apparent innocence that human rights campaigners have ever seen."

Life after prison
Richey was granted British citizenship in 2003, becoming the first to benefit from a change in British nationality law regarding the status of children of British mothers and non-British fathers born outside the United Kingdom.

2010 imprisonment
After returning to the United States in 2010, Richey was arrested in Mississippi and charged in Ohio with phoning in threatening messages to Judge Randall Basinger (who was assistant county prosecutor at the time of Richey's 1987 murder trial). Despite Richey's claim that the threats were merely a drunken prank, Visiting Judge Dale Crawford found Richey guilty and sentenced him to three years in prison. Richey was released after two years and, as of January 2018, is working with the American charity Sanctuary Quarters, building houses for homeless veterans.

2020 imprisonment
In October 2019 Richey was arrested in Columbus, Ohio after posting a video threatening Judge Randall Basinger, his children, and his grandchildren. In July 2020 he was convicted of making threats and sentenced to 12 years in jail.

See also 
 Krishna Maharaj, another British national fighting a murder conviction in the United States

Notes

References 

 Bradshaw v. Richey, 126 S. Ct. 602, 163 L. Ed. 2d 407, 2005 U.S. LEXIS 9033, 74 U.S.L.W. 3320, 19 Fla. L. Weekly Fed. S 7 (U.S. 2005)
 Richey v. Mitchell, 395 F.3d 660, 2005 U.S. App. LEXIS 1218, 2005 FED App. 39P (6th Cir.) (6th Cir. Ohio 2005)
 State v. Richey, Case No. 12-87-2, Court of Appeals of Ohio, Third Appellate District, Putnam County, 1989 Ohio App. LEXIS 4914, 28 December 1989
 State v. Richey, 64 Ohio St. 3d 353, 1992 Ohio 44, 595 N.E.2d 915, 1992 Ohio LEXIS 1723 (1992)
 State v. Richey, Case No. 12-97-7, Court Of Appeals Of Ohio, Third Appellate District, Putnam County, 1997 Ohio App. LEXIS 5284, 18 November 1997
 State v. Richey, 2000 Ohio 1843, 2000 Ohio App. LEXIS 2245 (Ohio Ct. App., Putnam County 26 May 2000)

External links 
 Richey at Amnesty UK
 Ohio DeathRow.com
 Affidavit of forensic scientist Tony Cafe

1964 births
Living people
American murderers of children
American people convicted of arson
American people convicted of murder
American prisoners sentenced to death
People convicted of murder by Ohio
Criminals from Edinburgh
People with antisocial personality disorder
People with borderline personality disorder
People with histrionic personality disorder
Prisoners sentenced to death by Ohio
People wrongfully convicted of murder
United States Marines